The 2013 Dunlop World Challenge was a professional tennis tournament played on indoor carpet courts. It was the sixth edition of the tournament which was part of the 2013 ITF Women's Circuit and the 2013 ATP Challenger Tour. It took place in Toyota, Aichi, Japan, on 18–24 November 2013.

Men's singles entrants

Seeds 

 1 Rankings as of 11 November 2013

Other entrants 
The following players received wildcards into the singles main draw:
  Sho Katayama
  Takao Suzuki
  Yusuke Watanuki
  Jumpei Yamasaki

The following players received special exempt into the singles main draw:
  Borna Ćorić

The following players received entry from the qualifying draw:
  Yuuya Kiba
  Takashi Saito
  Artem Sitak
  Danai Udomchoke

Women's singles entrants

Seeds 

 1 Rankings as of 11 November 2013

Other entrants 
The following players received wildcards into the singles main draw:
  Haruka Kaji
  Miyu Kato
  Makoto Ninomiya
  Yuuki Tanaka

The following players received entry from the qualifying draw:
  Kanae Hisami
  Hiroko Kuwata
  Emi Mutaguchi
  Akiko Yonemura

Champions

Men's singles 

  Matthew Ebden def.  Yūichi Sugita 6–3, 6–2

Women's singles 

  Luksika Kumkhum def.  Hiroko Kuwata 3–6, 6–1, 6–3

Men's doubles 

  Chase Buchanan /  Blaž Rola def.  Marcus Daniell /  Artem Sitak 4–6, 6–3, [10–4]

Women's doubles 

  Shuko Aoyama /  Misaki Doi def.  Eri Hozumi /  Makoto Ninomiya 7–6(7–1), 2–6, [11–9]

External links 
 2013 Dunlop World Challenge at ITFtennis.com
  

 
2013 ATP Challenger Tour
2013 ITF Women's Circuit
2013
November 2013 sports events in Asia
2013 in Japanese tennis